All Saints Episcopal Day School is a co-educational school for students from Nursery to 8th grade. The school is located in Hoboken, New Jersey, and occupies two campuses: the Elementary school and Middle schools are located at 707 Washington Street on the corner of 7th and Washington Streets, and the Early Childhood Center, which is located at 527 Clinton St. on the corner of Sixth and Clinton Streets, houses the Nursery, Pre-Kindergarten and Kindergarten programs. Both campuses boast historic landmark buildings, and include a gymnasium, movement room, library, science lab, art room, assembly space in the church, and private outdoor play yards.  There are SMART Boards in all classrooms and networked computers throughout all of the buildings.

The core curriculum consists of language arts, mathematics, science, social studies, physical education, world language and health, as well as special subjects including art, music, dance, drama, computers, and community service. The overall Student–teacher ratio is 6 to 1.

Each grade takes 6-10 field trips in New York City and its environs per year.  Beginning in the Fifth Grade, students go on a three-day overnight trips to Sprout Creek (Grade 5) and Frost Valley YMCA (Grade 6-7). Eighth Graders participate in an international exchange program with a school in Ecuador, and spend 10 days living with host families in Quito.

The majority of teachers at All Saints hold advanced degrees in their fields and/or areas of expertise, and are certified to teach in the state of New Jersey, and the staff of more than 30 teachers and assistants are supported in continued professional development. One All Saints Middle School teacher was named Teacher of the Year in October 2011 by the New Jersey Council for American Private Education (NJ CAPE). The award is presented annually by NJ CAPE and presented by the New Jersey Deputy Commissioner of Education. The faculty at All Saints routinely present their work at conferences in the state and around the country. All Saints Episcopal Day School is accredited by the New Jersey Association of Independent Schools, is sponsored by All Saints Episcopal Parish, and holds memberships in the National Association of Episcopal Schools and the National Middle School Association.

References

External links 
All Saints Episcopal Day School site

Private K–8 schools in the United States
Private elementary schools in New Jersey
Private middle schools in New Jersey
Buildings and structures in Hoboken, New Jersey
Schools in Hudson County, New Jersey
Episcopal schools in the United States